Shout (noun and verb) in Australian and New Zealand English, refers to an act of spontaneous giving.
Its primary use is in pub culture, where one person in a group elects to pay for a round of drinks for that group.
It may be that person's polite way of leaving the group to go elsewhere.

By extension, it can refer to paying for another person's purchase; something they have chosen or will choose for themselves, as distinct from a gift or present.
Typical constructions are:
"My shout", perhaps to expedite a minor transaction, as when paying for a shared meal.
"I'll shout you to the pictures"; "I'll shout you a new dress"
"He shouted her to a slap-up meal"
Historically, the term "shout" was used by Rolf Boldrewood in A Colonial Reformer (1877), Henry Lawson in his poem "The Glass on the Bar" (1890), Jack Moses in Beyond the City Gates (1923) and Dal Stivens in The Courtship of Uncle Henry (1946).

References 

Australian English